The Annales Vedastini or Annals of St-Vaast are a series of annals written in the early tenth century at the Abbey of St. Vaast in Arras. They are an important source for the ninth century. The years from 874 to 900 are covered with a strong bias for Lotharingian and West Frankish affairs. Like the Annales Fuldenses and Annales Bertiniani, the AV, as it is often abbreviated, was combined with the other Reichsannalen in the so-called Chronicon Vedastinum, a general chronicle covering the history of the Carolingian Empire up until 899.

See also
 Reichsannalen

References
 Reuter, Timothy (trans.) The Annals of Fulda. (Manchester Medieval series, Ninth-Century Histories, Volume II.) Manchester: Manchester University Press, 1992.
Annales Vedastini

Carolingian Latin historical texts
10th-century history books
10th-century Latin books
10th-century French historians
10th-century Latin writers